Dovid Harris (born 1945) is an Orthodox rabbi who along with Rabbi Akiva Grunblatt, serves as Rosh Hayeshiva (deans) at the Yeshivas Rabbeinu Yisrael Meir HaKohen. He is a prominent figure in the yeshiva world and speaks annually at the Torah Umesorah - National Society for Hebrew Day Schools convention. He also serves on the Rabbinic advisory committee of Torah Umesorah.

Life and education
Harris was born in 1945 in Scranton, Pennsylvania, where he attended Scranton Hebrew Day school. From there, he went to the Rabbinical Seminary of America in Queens, New York, graduating high school and continuing in its post-high school program.  In 1964, Harris, along with the entire Yeshiva, traveled to Israel to study. In 1968, Harris returned to Israel along with the entire Yeshiva. He remained there to help strengthen the Israel branch. Harris would complete his studies at the Yeshiva in 1973 after receiving his rabbinic ordination. He has continued working for the Yeshiva and its affiliates.

Career

In 1974, he co-founded the school's first external affiliate branch, the Talmudical Institute of Upstate New York, also known as "Rochester", together with Rabbi Menachem Davidowitz.

In the Fall of 1988, Harris also founded Mesivta Tiferes Yisroel, another branch of the Chofetz Chaim Network.

See also
 Yeshivas Rabbeinu Yisrael Meir HaKohen
 Mesivta Tiferes Yisroel (an affiliate school).
 Talmudical Institute of Upstate New York (an affiliate school).
 Rabbi Binyomin Luban

References

1945 births
Living people
American Haredi rabbis
Rosh yeshivas